What Shall We Do with Our Old? is a 1911 American silent drama film directed by  D. W. Griffith.

Cast
 W. Chrystie Miller - The Old Carpenter
 Claire McDowell - The Old Carpenter's Wife
 Adolph Lestina - The Doctor
 George Nichols - The Judge
 Elmer Booth - Assaulted Prisoner
 William J. Butler - In Shop
 Donald Crisp - Night Court Bailiff
 Edward Dillon - In Shop
 John T. Dillon - In Shop/In Jail
 Frank Evans - In Court
 Francis J. Grandon - Policeman
 Guy Hedlund - Young Carpenter in Shop/In Court
 J. Jiquel Lanoe - In Court
 Wilfred Lucas - Angry Prisoner
 Alfred Paget - In Shop
 Vivian Prescott - In Court
 W. C. Robinson - In Shop
 Charles West

See also
 1911 in film
D. W. Griffith filmography

References

External links

  What Shall We Do with Our Old? available for free download at Internet Archive

1911 films
1911 drama films
1911 short films
American silent short films
American black-and-white films
Silent American drama films
Biograph Company films
Films directed by D. W. Griffith
1910s American films